Hugo Charteris (28 December 1884 – 23 April 1916) was an English cricketer. He was a right-handed batsman who played for Gloucestershire. He was born in Salisbury and died in the Battle of Katia.

Charteris made a single first-class appearance for the side, during the 1910 season, against Surrey. From the lower order, he scored a single run in the only innings in which he batted.

Charteris' brother-in-law, Archer Windsor-Clive, and uncle Richard Charteris both played first-class cricket.

External links
Hugo Charteris at Cricket Archive 

1884 births
1916 deaths
English cricketers
Gloucestershire cricketers
Sportspeople from Salisbury
British military personnel killed in World War I